The Blues and Royals (Royal Horse Guards and 1st Dragoons) (RHG/D) is a cavalry regiment of the British Army, part of the Household Cavalry Regiment. The Colonel of the Regiment is Anne, Princess Royal. It is the second-most senior regiment in the British Army.

History

Formation
The regiment was formed in 1969 from the merger of the Royal Horse Guards, which was known as "the Blues" or "the Oxford Blues", and the Royal Dragoons, which was known as "the Royals". Of these, the Blues were founded as a unit of the New Model Army, having been raised in 1650 by Sir Arthur Haselrig on orders from Oliver Cromwell; it was incorporated into the Restoration army in 1660 and  gained the title "Royal" in the 18th century. The Royal Dragoons were formed shortly after the Restoration, in 1661, composed of cavalry veterans of the New Model Army.

Since formation in 1969, the new regiment has served in Northern Ireland, Germany, and Cyprus. During the Falklands War of 1982, the regiment provided the two armoured reconnaissance troops. The regiment also had a squadron on operational duty with the United Nations in Bosnia in 1994–95. Most recently, the regiment saw action in the Iraq War and the War in Afghanistan.

Both Prince William, Duke of Cambridge, and Prince Harry, Duke of Sussex, joined the regiment as cornets in 2006.

Operational union
As a result of the Options for Change Review in 1991, the Blues and Royals formed a union for operational purposes with the Life Guards as the Household Cavalry Regiment. However, they each maintain their regimental identity, with distinct uniforms and traditions, and their own colonel. The Blues and Royals currently has two reconnaissance squadrons in Windsor, which are part of the Household Cavalry Regiment, and a mounted squadron in London as part of the Household Cavalry Mounted Regiment.

Regimental traditions
Instead of being known as the Royal Horse Guards and 1st Dragoons, the regiment is known as the Blues and Royals and is therefore the only regiment in the British Army to be officially known by its nickname as opposed to its full name.

Newly commissioned officers in the Blues and Royals have the rank of cornet, rather than second lieutenant as is the standard in the rest of the British Army. There is no sergeant rank in the Household Cavalry; the equivalent of a sergeant in another unit is Corporal of Horse; the equivalent of Regimental Sergeant Major is Regimental Corporal Major, etc. King Edward VII established that the rank of private should be replaced by the rank of trooper in the cavalry.

The Blues and Royals is the only regiment in the British Army that allows troopers and non-commissioned officers, when not wearing headdress, to salute an officer. The custom started after the Battle of Warburg in 1760 by the Marquess of Granby, who commanded both the Royal Horse Guards and the Royal Dragoons, which were separate units at the time. During the battle, the Marquess had driven the French forces from the field, losing both his hat and his wig during the charge. When reporting to his commander, Prince Ferdinand of Brunswick, in the heat of the moment he is said to have saluted without wearing his headdress, having lost it earlier. When the Marquess of Granby became the Colonel of the Blues, the regiment adopted this tradition.

When the Household Cavalry mounts an escort to the Sovereign on State occasions, a ceremonial axe with a spike is carried by a Farrier Corporal of Horse. The historical reason behind this is that when a horse was wounded or injured so seriously that it could not be treated, its suffering was ended by killing it with the spike. The axe is also a reminder of the days when the Sovereign's escorts accompanied royal coaches and when English roads were very bad. Horses often fell, becoming entangled in their harnesses and had to be freed with the cut of an axe. It is also said that in those times, if a horse had to be killed, its rider had to bring back a hoof, cut off with the axe, to prove to the Quartermaster that the animal was dead and hence preventing fraudulent replacement. Today, the axe remains as a symbol of the Farrier's duties.

Uniform
The Blues and Royals wear their chin strap under their chin, as opposed to the Life Guards, who wear it below their lower lip. On service dress, the Blues and Royals wear a blue lanyard on the left shoulder, as well as a Sam Browne belt containing a whistle. In most dress orders, the Waterloo Eagle is worn on the left arm as part of dress traditions. The Blues and Royals, as part of the Household Division, does not use the Order of the Bath Star for its officer rank "pips", but rather the Order of the Garter Star.

Prince Harry wore the uniform at the wedding of his brother, Prince William, to Catherine Middleton. Both Prince Harry and Prince William also received permission from the Queen to wear the frock coat version of the uniform to Prince Harry's wedding to Meghan Markle.

The modern mess dress worn by officers of the regiment reflects the traditions of the Royal Dragoons and includes a scarlet jacket with dark blue facings.

Commanding officers
The commanding officers have been:
Lt Col Richard M. H. Vickers: March 1969–December 1970
Lt Col James A. C. G. Eyre: December 1970–July 1973
Lt Col William S.H. Boucher: July 1973–October 1975
Lt Col John H. Pitman: October 1975–February 1978
Lt Col Henry O. Hugh Smith: February 1978–April 1980
Lt Col James G. Hamilton-Russell: April 1980–October 1982
Lt Col Jeremy D. Smith-Bingham: October 1982–April 1985
Lt Col Hywel W. Davies: April 1985–August 1987
Lt Col Timothy J. Sulivan: August 1987–January 1990
Lt Col Peter B. Rogers: January 1990–October 1992

Colonels-in-chief
The regiment's colonels-in-chief were as follows:
1969–2022 Queen Elizabeth II
2022–present King Charles III

Regimental colonels
The regiment's colonels were as follows:
1969–1979: Field Marshal Sir Gerald Templer (formerly Colonel of Royal Horse Guards),
Deputy Colonel: General Sir Desmond Fitzpatrick (formerly Colonel of 1st The Royal Dragoons)
1979–1998: General Sir Desmond Fitzpatrick
1998–present: Anne, Princess Royal

Battle honours
The battle honours are:
Tangier 1662–1680, Dettingen, Warburg, Beaumont, Willems, Fuentes d'Onor, Peninsula, Waterloo, Balaclava, Sevastopol, Tel el Kebir, Egypt 1882, Relief of Ladysmith, South Africa 1899–1902
The Great War: Mons, Le Cateau, Retreat from Mons, Marne 1914, Aisne 1914, Messines 1914, Armentières 1914, Ypres 1914, Langemarck 1914, Gheluvelt, Nonne Bosschen, St Julien, Ypres 1915, Frezenberg, Loos, Arras 1917, Scarpe 1917, Ypres 1917, Broodseinde, Poelcappelle, Passchendaele, Somme 1918, St Quentin, Avre, Amiens, Hindenburg Line, Beaurevoir, Cambrai 1918, Sambre, Pursuit to Mons, France and Flanders 1914–18
The Second World War: Mont Pincon, Souleuvre, Noireau Crossing, Amiens 1944, Brussels, Neerpelt, Nederrijn, Lingen, Veghel, Nijmegen, Rhine, Bentheim, North-West Europe 1944–1945, Baghdad 1941, Iraq 1941, Palmyra, Syria 1941, Msus, Gazala, Knightsbridge, Defence of Alamein Line, El Alamein, El Agheila, Advance on Tripoli, North Africa 1941–43, Sicily 1943, Arezzo, Advance to Florence, Gothic Line, Italy 1943–44
Falkland Islands 1982
Iraq 2003*

*Awarded jointly with the Life Guards for services of the Household Cavalry Regiment

References

Sources

External links

Household Cavalry Museum Website
Official site
Band of the Blues and Royals
British Army Locations from 1945 British Army Locations from 1945

Military units and formations established in 1969
Cavalry regiments of the British Army
Guards regiments
Household Cavalry
Military units and formations of the United Kingdom in the Falklands War
Military units and formations of the Iraq War
Military units and formations of the United Kingdom in the War in Afghanistan (2001–2021)
1969 establishments in the United Kingdom